London club may refer to:
London Club, an international group of creditors
London Clubs International, a British gambling company
London Golf Club, a golf club in Ash, Kent
a club on the List of London's gentlemen's clubs